Alexander is a male given name.

Alexander may also refer to:

Arts and entertainment

Films
 Alexander (1996 film), a Tamil action film
 Alexander (2004 film), an epic about Alexander the Great directed by Oliver Stone
 Alexander (2008 film), a Russian historical film about Alexander Nevsky

Gaming
 Alexander (video game), a real-time strategy game 
 Rome: Total War: Alexander, a PC game

Music
 Alexander (soundtrack), the Vangelis score of the 2004 film Alexander
 Alexander (Alex Ebert album), 2011
 "Alexander" (song), a 2013 song by Rey Pila
 "Alexander", a 1971 song by Jeannette van Zutphen

Fictional characters
 Alexander, a Peppa Pig character

Businesses
 Gebr. Alexander, a German manufacturer of musical instruments, founded in 1782
 Alexander Aircraft Company, an aircraft manufacturer in Colorado, U.S., in 1925
 Alexander Patent Racket Company, an Australian sports equipment manufacturer, founded in 1925
 Walter Alexander Coachbuilders, an bus and coach bodywork builder, founded in 1913

People
 Alexander (surname), including a list of people with the surname

Places

Australia
 Alexander River (Western Australia)
 Lake Alexander (Northern Territory), a man-made lake

Canada
 Alexander, Manitoba
 Rural Municipality of Alexander, Manitoba

United States
 Alexander City, Alabama, a city
 Alexander Archipelago, Alaska, a group of islands
 Alexander Creek, Alaska, also known as Alexander, an unincorporated community
 *Alexander Creek (Susitna River), a stream
 Alexander, Arkansas, a city
 Alexander Valley AVA, California, an American Viticultural Area
 Alexander, Georgia, an unincorporated community
 Alexander County, Illinois
 Alexander, Iowa, a city
 Alexander, Kansas, a city
 Alexander, Maine, a town
 Alexander, New York, a town
 Alexander (village), New York
 Alexander County, North Carolina
 Alexander, North Dakota, a city
 Alexander, West Virginia, an unincorporated community
 Alexander Archipelago, Alaska
 Lake Alexander (Alaska)
 Alexander Lake (southcentral Alaska)
 Lake Alexander (Minnesota)

Elsewhere
 Alexander (crater), on the Moon
 Alexander Church, a Neo-Gothic church in Tampere, Finland
 Alexander Island, Antarctica

Plants
 Alexander (grape), a hybrid grape
 Isabella (grape), also called Alexander
 Smyrnium olusatrum, common name Alexanders, an edible cultivated flowering plant

Ships
 , eight ships of the Royal Navy
 Alexander (ship), other ships or sailing vessels

Other uses
 Alexander (cocktail), an alcoholic drink made with Cognac
 Alexander Technique, a method of removing muscular tension
 Alexander disease, a very rare disease
 Alexander violin, a string instrument

See also
 
 Zizia aurea, or golden alexanders, a flowering perennial forb of the carrot family
 Alexander's (disambiguation)
 Aleksander (Hasidic dynasty)
 Alexandre (disambiguation)